Rufina (\r(u)-fi-na\) is a female given name and surname, meaning "red-haired". It is claimed to be of  Latin, Greek, Italian, Russian or Spanish origin. As a first name, it is the female equivalent of Rufus.

People 
 Claudia Rufina, a woman of British descent who lived in Rome c. 90 AD
 Rufina Alfaro, a possibly legendary figure in the Panamanian independence movement
 Rufina Amaya (1943–2007), sole survivor of the El Mozote massacre
 Rufina Gasheva (1921–2012), Soviet aviator during World War II
 Rufina Nifontova (1931–1994), member of the Communist Party of the Soviet Union since 1972
 Rufina Pukhova (born 1932), Russian memoir writer
 Rufina Ubah (born 1959), former Nigerian sprinter who specialised in the 100 metres
Rufina and Secunda (died 257), Roman virgin-martyrs and Christian saints
Rufina of Caesarea, 3rd-century Christian martyr
Saint Rufina, a 3rd-century Christian martyr

References